Marin Draganja and Henri Kontinen were the defending champions, but Kontinen chose not to participate. Draganja played alongside Julian Knowle, but lost in the quarterfinals to Teymuraz Gabashvili and Nick Kyrgios.
Mate Pavić and Michael Venus won the title, defeating Jonathan Erlich and Colin Fleming in the final, 6–2, 6–3.

Seeds

Draw

Draw

References
 Main Draw

Open 13 Provence - Doubles
2016 Doubles